Internet calendar may refer to:

 the iCalendar file format
 Swatch Internet Time